Canhoca is a town in northwestern Angola.  It belongs to Cuanza Norte Province.

Namesake 

There is another town in Angola with the same name in Benguela Province.

Transport 

Canhoca is a junction station on the Luanda Railway for a short branch to the north.

See also 

 Railway stations in Angola

References 

Populated places in Cuanza Norte Province